Gruen Playhouse (also known as Gruen Guild Playhouse) is a dramatic anthology series that aired on ABC and the now-defunct DuMont Television Network.

Sponsored by the Gruen Watch Company, the series aired on ABC on Thursdays at 9:30pm ET, and on DuMont on Thursdays at 9pm ET. From January to March 1952, Gruen Playhouse alternated with Shadow of the Cloak on DuMont.

The 30-minute dramas featured actors such as Carolyn Jones (in her TV debut), Raymond Burr (in his TV debut), and Bonita Granville. An early episode was written by Star Trek creator Gene Roddenberry.

Episode status
Two DuMont episodes are held in the collection of the UCLA Film and Television Archive, along with a single ABC episode.

See also
List of programs broadcast by the DuMont Television Network
List of surviving DuMont Television Network broadcasts
1951-52 United States network television schedule

References

Bibliography
David Weinstein, The Forgotten Network: DuMont and the Birth of American Television (Philadelphia: Temple University Press, 2004) 
Alex McNeil, Total Television, Fourth edition (New York: Penguin Books, 1980) 
Tim Brooks and Earle Marsh, The Complete Directory to Prime Time Network TV Shows, Third edition (New York: Ballantine Books, 1964)

External links
 
List of episodes at CTVA
DuMont historical website

1951 American television series debuts
1952 American television series endings
1950s American anthology television series
American Broadcasting Company original programming
1950s American drama television series
Black-and-white American television shows
DuMont Television Network original programming

English-language television shows